Micropholis crassipedicellata is a species of tree in the family Sapotaceae. The plant is endemic to the Atlantic Forest ecoregion in southeastern Brazil. It is threatened by habitat loss.

References

crassipedicellata
Endemic flora of Brazil
Flora of the Atlantic Forest
Trees of Brazil
Conservation dependent plants
Near threatened biota of South America
Taxonomy articles created by Polbot